Lucky Man may refer to:

Film and television
 A Lucky Man, a 1930 American Spanish-language comedy film
 Lucky Man (1995 film), a 1995 Indian Tamil-language film starring Karthik
 Lucky Man (2022 film), a 2022 Indian Kannada-language film
 Stan Lee's Lucky Man, a 2016–2018 British crime drama television series

Music

Albums 
 Lucky Man (Charlie Major album), 1995
 Lucky Man (Dave Koz album), 1993
 Lucky Man (Hal Ketchum album), 1991
 Lucky Man (Bobby album), 2021

Songs 
 "Lucky Man" (Emerson, Lake & Palmer song), 1970
 "Lucky Man" (Montgomery Gentry song), 2007
 "Lucky Man" (The Verve song), 1997
 "Lucky Man", by Arashi from How's It Going?, 2003
 "Lucky Man", by Bruce Springsteen from Tracks, 1998
 "Lucky Man", by Hurricane No. 1 from Hurricane No. 1, 1997
 "Lucky Man", by Lynyrd Skynyrd from Vicious Cycle, 2003
 "Lucky Man", by Mister Loco, 1976
 "Lucky Man", by Starbuck, 1976
 "Lucky Man", by Steve Miller Band from Sailor, 1968

Other uses
 Lucky Man: A Memoir, a 2002 autobiography by Michael J. Fox
 Lucky Man Cree Nation, a Cree First Nation in Saskatchewan, Canada

See also
 Lucky the Man a 2001 album by Wizz Jones
 O Lucky Man!, a 1973 film
 Tottemo! Luckyman, a 1993 Japanese manga and anime series